Michał Radziwiłł may refer to:

Michał Kazimierz Radziwiłł (1635-1680) - Deputy Chancellor of Lithuania, Field Lithuanian Hetman, voivode of Wilno
Michał Kazimierz Radziwiłł Rybeńko (1702-1762) - Grand Lithuanian Hetman, voivode of Wilno
Michał Hieronim Radziwiłł (1744-1831) - voivode of Wilno
Michał Gedeon Radziwiłł (1778-1850) - general, Polish leader during the November Uprising
Michał Radziwiłł Rudy (1870-1954) - Polish noble, prince